Marianna Nagy (13 January 1929 – 3 May 2011) was a Hungarian pair skater. Together with her brother László Nagy she won five bronze medals at the Olympic Games (1952 and 1956) and World championships (1950, 1953, 1955), as well as two European titles (1950 and 1955). After retiring from competitions she starred in ice shows and worked as a skating coach.

Competitive highlights
(with László Nagy)

References

1929 births
2011 deaths
Figure skaters at the 1948 Winter Olympics
Figure skaters at the 1952 Winter Olympics
Figure skaters at the 1956 Winter Olympics
Olympic figure skaters of Hungary
Olympic bronze medalists for Hungary
Hungarian female pair skaters
Olympic medalists in figure skating
World Figure Skating Championships medalists
European Figure Skating Championships medalists
Medalists at the 1952 Winter Olympics
Medalists at the 1956 Winter Olympics
20th-century Hungarian women